Tadeusz Myler (19 January 1949 – 30 August 2022) was a Polish entrepreneur and politician. A member of the Democratic Left Alliance, he served in the Sejm from 2001 to 2005.

Myler died on 30 August 2022, at the age of 73.

References

1949 births
2022 deaths
Members of the Polish Sejm 2001–2005
Democratic Left Alliance politicians
People from Kościan County